The Story of Short Stack is a 2011 documentary which documents the journeys of Australian pop punk band Short Stack. It was directed, produced and edited by band member Andy Clemmensen. It starred many people, notably the band itself (Shaun Diviney, Andy Clemmensen and Bradie Webb). The film was premiered on 27 October 2011 and officially released on 4 November 2011.

The documentary spent years being made. It included the band's entire back catalogue of film clips and highlights of their career from their debut album Stack Is the New Black through to the cover of Rolling Stone on their 2010 album This is Bat Country and their single "Bang Bang Sexy".

The revelation of the title and track listing of Short Stack's third studio album was on this documentary. It was revealed as Art Vandelay. Art Vandelay was released on Friday 18 October 2013, however with a slightly altered track listing.

Trailer
A trailer was released on Short Stack's official YouTube channel, featuring excerpts from some of the interviews and featured clips from the movie and the new music video for "Bang Bang Sexy", which was also played in the background throughout the trailer.

Premiere
The film was premiered live via satellite on 27 October 2011 at Event Cinemas around Australia. Hosted by Hot 30's Matty Acton and Maude Garrett, the cinema event included a live acoustic set by the band, a live Q&A with fans in cinema and the first screening of their documentary. Regardless of which cinema fans go to across the country, they were able to share in the same experience live.

The Perth screening time was shifted for the audiences enjoyment.

Diviney, Clemmensen and Webb also walked the red carpet at Event Cinemas George Street in Sydney at the Official World Premiere. There were only a limited number of tickets available to the event.

Reception
On the purchase page for the DVD on the band's official website, the film has received all positive reviews. The total is 5 out of 5 stars, excluding the spam comments.

Credits

Starring

Other

Featured songs

by Short Stack

References

Australian documentary films
Documentary films about punk music and musicians
2010s English-language films